A Star-Wheeled Sky is a 2018 science fiction novel by Brad R. Torgersen and published by Baen Books. It won Best Science Fiction Novel at the 2019 Dragon Awards and has received mixed-to-positive reviews.

Plot
It has been thousands of years since humanity left a ruined Earth. Many of them settled within the Waywork, a system of about 50 star systems connected by a set of wormholes. The Waywork has been completely explored for hundreds of years, and the settled systems are bursting at the seams. One day, a new waypoint appears on the border between two warring factions. This causes a rush between the two to see who can lay claim to the new system and its resources.

Reception
A Star-Wheeled Sky received mixed-to-positive reviews. Mike Lardas, of The Daily News called A Star-Wheeled Sky "marvelous sci-fi entertainment" and stated it  "offer[ed] a fresh take on interstellar conflict". The Substrate Wars called it an "engaging, readable beginning to a series", full of "space battles, believable characters, [and] intriguing worldbuilding". On the other hand, Looking for a Good Book said that the military science fiction aspect "[shone] brightest here", but that the characters were only "okay" and that "it won’t likely excite too many readers".

A Star-Wheeled Sky won Best Science Fiction Novel at the 2019 Dragon Awards.

References

2018 American novels
2018 science fiction novels
American science fiction novels
Baen Books books
Fiction about wormholes
Interstellar travel in fiction
Novels set in the future
Space exploration novels
Space opera novels